Monika Stachowska (born 2 January 1981) is a Polish handball player. She plays for the club SPR Pogoń Szczecin, the Polish national team and represented Poland at the 2013 World Women's Handball Championship in Serbia.

References

External links
Player profile at the Polish Handball Association website 

Polish female handball players
1981 births
Living people
Sportspeople from Toruń
21st-century Polish women